A bantam, in British Army usage, was a soldier of below the army's minimum regulation height of . 

This enabled shorter but healthy young men to enlist.

Bantam units enlisted from industrial and coal-mining areas where short stature was no sign of weakness. The name derives from the town of Bantam in Indonesia, from which a breed of small domestic fowl allegedly originated. Bantamweight was a weight category in boxing that had originated in the 1880s and had produced many notable boxers.

The first "bantam battalions" were recruited in Birkenhead, Cheshire, after Alfred Bigland, MP, heard of a group of miners who, rejected from every recruiting office, had made their way to the town. One of the miners, rejected on account of his size, offered to fight any man there as proof of his suitability as a soldier, and six men were eventually called upon to remove him. Bantam applicants were men used to physical hard work, and Bigland was so incensed at what he saw as the needless rejection of spirited healthy men that he petitioned the War Office for permission to establish an undersized fighting unit.

When the permission was granted, news spread across the country and men previously denied the chance to fight made their way to Birkenhead, 3,000 successful recruits being accepted for service into two new bantam battalions in November 1914. Chest size was one inch (2.5 cm) more than the army standard.

The men became local heroes, with the local newspaper, The Birkenhead News, honouring the men of the 1st and 2nd Birkenhead Battalions of the Cheshires with enamel badges - "BBB" - "Bigland's Birkenhead Bantams". Soon renamed the 15th and 16th Battalions, Cheshire Regiment, they undertook gruelling training and served in some of the hardest-fought battles of the war, such as the Battle of Arras in 1917. Another bantam battalion was the 14th Battalion (West of England), the Gloucestershire Regiment, raised in 1915 and sent to France in 1916. Eventually two whole divisions, the 35th and the 40th, were formed from "Bantam" men, who were virtually annihilated during the Battle of Bourlon. Heavy casualties, transfers to specialized Army tunneling companies and tank regiments, the introduction of conscription, and replacements by taller men, eventually led to Bantam units becoming indistinguishable from other British divisions.

Sidney Allinson has published a thorough study: The Bantams: The Untold Story of World War One.

See also
143rd Battalion (British Columbia Bantams), CEF
216th Battalion (Bantams), CEF

References

External links
 
 
 
 

British Army in World War I
Human height